The 2006 Budapest mayoral election was held on 1 October 2006 to elect the Mayor of Budapest (főpolgármester). On the same day, local elections were held throughout Hungary, including the districts of Budapest. The election was run using a First-past-the-post voting system. The winner of this election served for 4 years.

The election was won by four-time incumbent, Gábor Demszky.

Results

Notes 
a.

References 

2006 in Hungary
2006 elections in Europe
Local elections in Hungary
History of Budapest